The Mystery of St. Martin's Bridge (Italian:L'assassina del Ponte S. Martin) is a 1913 Italian silent drama film directed by Roberto Roberti and starring Bice Valerian.

Plot
"Lord Martagne, wins the heart of Cora, a mountain girl, and then casts her aside. Cora seeks revenge, but is foiled. Many passionate scenes follow, and the climax is reached when the girl disguised fights a duel with the nobleman and kills him. Another couple are convicted of the murder, but Cora confesses at the last moment."

Cast
 Bice Valerian 
 Roberto Roberti 
 Antonietta Calderari 
 Frederico Elvezi 
 Maria Orciuoli

References

Bibliography
 Moscati, Italo. Sergio Leone: quando il cinema era grande. Lindau, 2007.

External links

1913 films
1910s Italian-language films
Films directed by Roberto Roberti
Italian silent feature films
Italian black-and-white films
Italian drama films
1913 drama films
Silent drama films